Calvin Pearly "Ginger, Red, Torchy" Gardner (October 30, 1924 – October 10, 2001) was a Canadian professional ice hockey player in the NHL. In 1943, after playing professional hockey for three years and winning the Memorial Cup, he joined the Canadian military and took part in World War II. At the conclusion of the war, he once again began playing professional hockey, joining the New York Rangers affiliate, the New York Rovers. With the Rovers, Gardner would centre a line with fellow Manitobans Church Russell and Rene Trudell. The trio were dominate, with all three players being called up to the Rangers and making their debut on February 10, 1946. From their debut, the trio remained intact as a line until December 1947, with the unit being nicknamed "Whiz Kids" and the "rover-boy line." Following the 1948 season, the Rangers traded Gardner to the Toronto Maple Leafs, with whom he won two Stanley Cup championships.

He died in 2001. His two sons Paul and Dave were also professional ice hockey players.

While playing for the Springfield Indians of the AHL in the 1957–58 season, Gardner served as an assistant coach. Gardner also served as a player-head coach while with the Kingston Frontenacs of the EPHL in 1959-60.

NHL Transactions
1945: Signed as a free agent with the New York Rovers (EHL).
April 26, 1948: Traded to the Toronto Maple Leafs (along with Bill Juzda, Rene Trudel and the rights to Frank Mathers) for Wally Stanowski and Elwyn Morris.
September 11, 1952: Traded to the Chicago Black Hawks (along with Ray Hannigan, Gus Mortson and Al Rollins) for Harry Lumley.
June 26, 1953: Traded to the Boston Bruins in exchange for cash.

Sources: Legends of Hockey NHLTradeTracker.com

Awards and achievements
Memorial Cup Championship (1943)
EHL First All-Star Team (1946)
EHL Scoring Champion (1946)
Played in NHL All-Star game (1948 & 1949)
Stanley Cup Championships (1949 & 1951)
AHL Second All-Star Team (1958)
Honoured Member of the Manitoba Hockey Hall of Fame

Career statistics

Regular season and playoffs

Coaching record

References

External links

1924 births
2001 deaths
Boston Bruins players
Boston Bruins announcers
Canadian expatriate ice hockey players in the United States
Canadian ice hockey centres
Canadian military personnel of World War II
Chicago Blackhawks players
Kingston Frontenacs (EPHL) players
National Hockey League All-Stars
New York Rangers players
New York Rovers players
Providence Reds players
St. Boniface Canadiens players
Ice hockey people from Winnipeg
Springfield Indians
Springfield Indians players
Stanley Cup champions
Toronto Maple Leafs players
Winnipeg Esquires players
Winnipeg Rangers players